The following is a list in progress of prominent Utah artists.
 

A
 George Edward Anderson, photographer
 Paige Crosland Anderson, painter

B
 Pat Bagley, editorial cartoonist and illustrator
 Earl W. Bascom, sculptor
 Milo Baughman, modern furniture designer
 Anna Campbell Bliss, visual artist and architect
 Solon Borglum, sculptor
 Don Busath, photographer
 Blair Buswell, sculptor

C
 Thomas Battersby Child, Jr., "outsider artist", known for the Gilgal Sculpture Garden
 C. C. A. Christensen, painter
 James C. Christensen, painter, illustrator
 John Willard Clawson, painter
 Henry Lavender Adolphus Culmer, painter

D
Cyrus Edwin Dallin, sculptor

E
 Edwin Evans, painter

F
 Avard Fairbanks, sculptor
 John B. Fairbanks, painter
 Ortho R. Fairbanks, sculptor
 Dean Fausett, painter
 Lynn Fausett, painter
 Kathryn Jean Finlayson, painter
 Edward J. Fraughton, sculptor
 Arnold Friberg, painter

G
 Alvin Gittens, painter

H
 John Hafen, painter
 James Taylor Harwood, painter

J
 Parker Jacobs, illustrator
 Franz M. Johansen, sculptor/painter

K
 Brian Kershisnik, painter
 Torleif S. Knaphus, sculptor

L
 Alfred Lambourne, painter
 Bryan Larsen, painter

M
 Kenneth C. Madsen, painter
 Jon McNaughton, painter 
 Miranda Meeks, digital artist

N
 Bryan Niven

O
 George M. Ottinger, painter

P
 Cat Palmer, photographer
 Del Parson, painter
 Kathleen Peterson, painter
 Lorus Pratt, painter

R
 Mary Lou Romney, painter
 Lee Greene Richards, painter

S
 Charles Roscoe Savage, photographer
 Dennis Smith, sculptor
 Sril Art, mural artist
 LeConte Stewart, painter
 Liz Lemon Swindle, painter

T
 Iosua Tai Taeoalii, mixed-media artist
 Debra Teare
 Mary H. Teasdel, impressionist painter
 Minerva Teichert, painter

U
 Ernest Untermann, painter

W
 William W. Ward, stone carver, architect
 Florence Ware, painter
 Kevin Wasden, illustrator
 Stanley J. Watts, sculptor
 Dan Weggeland, painter
 Don Weller, painter

Z

See also
 List of Latter Day Saints: Artists
 List of people from Utah
 Mormon art
 Springville Museum of Art

References

Additional reading
 
 

 List of Utah artists
Lists of American artists
Artists